Yohwa Eoludong (요화 어을우동) is a 1987 South Korean film about the incredible life of Joseon-era kisaeng writer, artist and poet Uhwudong directed by Kim Gi-hyun and starring Kim Muh-hee.

Plot summary 
The story follows Eoludong (Uhwudong), a gisaeng, poet, writer, and artist who lived in 15th century Korea. Eoludong was a beautiful, talented, and intelligent young woman who was able to read and write well.

However, she was a divorced woman, which was not socially acceptable. She had no other choice but to become a gisaeng, and she used her position to gain favor with the noble classes.

Cast 
 Kim Muh-hee - Eoludong
 Park Geun-hyung
 Guk Jeong-hwan

External links 
 Yohwa Eoludong 

1987 films
1980s romance films
South Korean biographical films
Films set in the 15th century
Films set in the Joseon dynasty
1980s Korean-language films
Biographical films about entertainers